Utahraptor State Park is a state park in Grand County, Utah, United States, about  northwest of Moab.

Description
The park contains the Dalton Wells Quarry, which have yielded remains of dinosaurs that have advanced understanding of paleontology, such as those of the giant dromaeosaur dinosaur Utahraptor ostrommaysi. Fossils found in the park include those from the early Cretaceous at least 135 to 110 million years ago, such as dinosaurs, such bird-like Nedcolbertia, armoured Gastonia, and long-necked Moabosaurus.

History
Dalton Wells is also the site of a historic Civilian Conservation Corps camp that was later used as the Moab Isolation Center, an internment camp for Japanese Americans during World War II.

In 1975, palaeontologist Jim Jensen from Brigham Young University dug at the site. In 1993, Jim Kirkland, Robert Gaston, and Donald Burge used fossils from Dalton Wells and elsewhere to describe a new giant raptor, naming it Utahraptor.

In 2001, a large block was excavated, containing several specimens of Utahraptor, representing a large group surrounding an ornithopod dinosaur. In 2013, further research of it began, currently ongoing, overseen by Kirkland.

On March 11, 2021 state legislators passed a bill to create Utahraptor State Park. The law that established the park was sponsored by state representative Steve Eliason. The legislation which created the park also included the establishment of the Lost Creek State Park in Morgan County.

See also

 List of Utah State Parks

References

External links

  
 H.B. 257 Utah State Park Amendments (law establishing the park, 2021)
 H.B. 322 Utahraptor State Park (previous bill, 2020)
 Noehill: Dalton Wells Civilian Conservation Corps Camp and Moab Relocation Center

State parks of Utah
Protected areas of Grand County, Utah
Protected areas established in 2021
Provincial and state parks in the Rocky Mountains